Order of the Republic of Serbia is the highest state order of Serbia.
The order is awarded by the decree of the President of Serbia on special occasions. It is awarded in the first class on a large necklace (to presidents or sovereigns of states), and in the second class on a ribbon (to presidents of states or governments).

Ranks
Order of the Republic of Serbia has two classes.

Recipients

1st class
2022 -  Viktor Orbán
2021 -  Milorad Dodik
 2021 -  Patriarch Kirill of Moscow
 2018 -  Nursultan Nazarbayev
 2016 -  Xi Jinping
 2013 -  Vladimir Putin

2nd class

2022 -  Abdel Fattah el-Sisi
2022 -  Shinzo Abe
2022 -  Željka Cvijanović
 2021 -  Nana Akufo-Addo
 2021 -  Sebastian Kurz
 2021 -  Prokopis Pavlopoulos
 2021 -  Yury Borisov
 2020 -  Xavier Bettel
 2020 -  Albert II, Prince of Monaco
 2020 -  Miloš Zeman
 2019 -  Boyko Borisov
 2018 -  Nicos Anastasiades
 2017 -  Marcelo Rebelo de Sousa
 2017 -  Mohammed bin Zayed Al Nahyan
 2016 -  Catherine Samba-Panza
 2016 -  Nkosazana Dlamini-Zuma
 2016 -  Yoweri Museveni
 2016 -  Beji Caid Essebsi
 2016 -  Omar al-Bashir
 2016 -  James Michel
 2016 -  Manuel Pinto da Costa
 2016 -  Paul Kagame
 2016 -  Muhammadu Buhari
 2016 -  Hage Geingob
 2016 -  Filipe Nyusi
 2016 -  Ameenah Gurib-Fakim
 2016 -  Mohammed VI of Morocco
 2016 -  Ibrahim Boubacar Keïta
 2016 -  Hery Rajaonarimampianina
 2016 -  Denis Sassou Nguesso
 2016 -  Joseph Kabila
 2016 -  Uhuru Kenyatta
 2016 -  Paul Biya
 2016 -  Salva Kiir Mayardit
 2016 -  Jacob Zuma
 2016 -  Robert Mugabe
 2016 -  Jorge Carlos Fonseca
 2016 -  Edgar Lungu
 2016 -  Mulatu Teshome
 2016 -  Isaias Afwerki
 2016 -  Teodoro Obiang Nguema Mbasogo
 2016 -  Ian Khama
 2016 -  José Eduardo dos Santos
 2016 -  Abdelaziz Bouteflika
 2015 -  Fidel Castro
 2015 -  Portia Simpson-Miller
 2015 -  Pietro Parolin
 2013 -  Hugo Chávez (posthumously)
 2013 -  Serzh Sargsyan
 2013 -  Ilham Aliyev
 2013 -  Alexander Lukashenko
 2013 -  Demetris Christofias
 2013 -  Mikheil Saakashvili
 2013 -  Karolos Papoulias
 2013 -  Nursultan Nazarbayev
 2013 -  Almazbek Atambayev
 2013 -  Nicolae Timofti
 2013 -  Traian Băsescu
 2013 -  Ivan Gašparovič
 2013 -  Mariano Rajoy
 2013 -  Emomali Rahmon
 2013 -  Gurbanguly Berdimuhamedow
 2013 -  Viktor Yanukovych
 2013 -  Islam Karimov

See also 
 Orders, decorations and medals of Serbia

References

Awards established in 2009
Orders, decorations, and medals of Serbia
Orders of chivalry awarded to heads of state, consorts and sovereign family members